Tim Tamashiro is a Canadian jazz singer, radio broadcaster and speaker.

Tim was the host of Tonic, a nightly jazz program on CBC Radio 2 from March 2007 until late June 2017. He became the full-time host of Tonic on April 2, 2012, after the retirement of weekday host Katie Malloch.

Honours and awards
On June 5, 2015 Red Deer College awarded an honorary degree in Interdisciplinary Studies to Tim Tamashiro.

References

External links
Tim Tamashiro official website
Tim Tamashiro website archive(via Wayback Machine archive)

Canadian jazz singers
Canadian male singers
Canadian musicians of Japanese descent
Living people
CBC Radio hosts
Jazz radio presenters
Canadian male jazz musicians
Year of birth missing (living people)